The Nationalist Canary Party (PNC) is a nationalist political party in the Canary Islands. Its current headquarters are in Santa Cruz de Tenerife, Tenerife.

Precedents
The first PNC (CNP) was founded in Havana, Cuba on 30 January 1924, by Jose G. Cabrera Díaz, a Canarian journalist who became president of the party. He had been a trade union leader of Canary workers. On 5 August 1900, they had founded the Working Canary Association. In the 1920s, Díaz left his working-class roots to defend the interests of the middle class. Though the Cuban PNC proclaimed itself as inheritor of Secundino Delgado's thought, the party ideology was far away from the near to anarchism ideas of national and social liberation by Delgado.

The newspaper El Guanche, founded in 1897, was a primary supporter of the party. The party adopted as Canary flag, the "Flag of the Ateneo" (also called "Secundino's Flag"), that is to say, with seven white stars on a blue background arranged to match the position of the country's various islands.

History
In 1982, the newly created PNC held its first congress in the Canary Islands. The party adopted as symbols the 1970s MPAIAC flag, apart from the "Ateneo Flag", as well as some of the Cuban PNC political positions.

In 1993, the party merged with others to form Canarian Coalition (CC), but left the group in 1998. In 2003, after tensions between the militants and the direction, a splinter group formed another "Partido Nacionalista Canario", known as PaNaCa, which accused PNC of betraying its nationalist reivindications. Finally, PaNaCa joined CC.

See also
 Canarian nationalism

References

Political parties in the Canary Islands
Political parties established in 1924
Regionalist parties in Spain
Canarian nationalist parties
Centrist parties in Spain
1924 establishments in Cuba